Trevor John Eve (born 1 July 1951) is an English film and television actor. In 1979 he gained fame as the eponymous lead in the detective series Shoestring and is also known for his role as Detective Superintendent Peter Boyd in BBC television drama Waking the Dead. He is the father of three children, including actress Alice Eve.

Early life

Eve was born in Sutton Coldfield, near Birmingham, the son of Elsie (née Hamer) and Stewart Frederick Eve. His father was English, and his Welsh mother was from Glynneath. Educated at Bromsgrove School, he had little acting experience during his school days. He studied architecture at Kingston Polytechnic (now Kingston University) in London. He dropped out of the course after three years to enrol at the Royal Academy of Dramatic Art (RADA), where, upon leaving, he was awarded The Bancroft Gold Medal.

Career

Eve portrayed Paul McCartney in Willy Russell's 1974 play John, Paul, George, Ringo ... and Bert at the Lyric Theatre in London's West End, which won The Evening Standard Award and London Critics Awards for Best Musical.

Eve appeared in Hindle Wakes (1976) directed by Laurence Olivier as part of the Laurence Olivier Presents TV series. In 1977, Eve joined the cast of Franco Zeffirelli's Filumena in London's West End, where he met future wife, Sharon Maughan.

From 1979 to 1980, he played the role of the private investigator Eddie Shoestring in Shoestring. He then went on to his first major film role in the 1979 Dracula directed by John Badham, playing Jonathan Harker, alongside Laurence Olivier. In 1981, Eve won the Laurence Olivier Award for Best Actor, playing James Leeds in Children of a Lesser God.

After appearing at The Royal Court Theatre in The Genius, he returned to the West End to star in Cole Porter's High Society with Natasha Richardson and Stephen Rea, followed by his portrayal as Paolino in the 1988 Royal National Theatre production of Man, Beast And Virtue, directed by William Gaskill.

In television, he appeared in A Sense of Guilt in 1989, and the 1992 BBC production of A Doll's House with Juliet Stevenson, whom he also worked alongside in the BAFTA and International Emmy Award-winning political drama The Politician's Wife. He co-starred in the short-lived 1985 ABC series Shadow Chasers. In 1991, he co-starred with Francesca Annis in the BBC miniseries Parnell and the Englishwoman portraying the Irish politician Charles Stewart Parnell. Eve won his second Laurence Olivier Award in 1996 for his portrayal of Dr Astrov in Uncle Vanya.

He then went on to star in the 1998 Carlton Television/WGBH Boston television series Heat of the Sun, which was filmed in Zimbabwe, and portrayed Edward Murdstone in BBC's 1999 adaptation of David Copperfield. In September 2000, Eve starred in the BBC drama series Waking the Dead in the role of Detective Superintendent Peter Boyd. Eve continued to play Boyd throughout the subsequent nine series of the drama.

Eve was one of the artists who recited Shakespearian sonnets on the 2002 album When Love Speaks. That same year, Eve played Cropper in Possession, directed by Neil LaBute, and continued his work in film in Troy directed by Wolfgang Petersen in 2004, and The Family Man in 2006.

In April 2008, Eve starred as game show host and TV personality Hughie Green in the BBC Four biographical film Hughie Green, Most Sincerely. In 2010, Eve played the father of the female lead, his real-life daughter, Alice, in She's Out of My League, and starred as Peter Manson in the ITV/Mammoth Screen remake of Bouquet of Barbed Wire. In January 2011, he starred in the three-part ITV drama Kidnap and Ransom, filmed on location in South Africa, and reprised his role as Dominic King in 2012 for the second series.

After co-founding Projector Productions in 1995, Eve has produced TV movies Cinderella featuring Kathleen Turner, Alice through The Looking Glass starring Kate Beckinsale, and Twelfth Night starring Chiwetel Ejiofor. Eve also served as executive producer on his successful series Kidnap and Ransom, and The Body Farm with Tara Fitzgerald.

He also starred in a three-part drama on ITV called Lawless. Eve played the part of Judge Sir Selwyn Hardcastle in the BBC's Death Comes to Pemberley in December 2013, and as Roach in The Interceptor in 2014. Eve also worked on son Jack Eve's debut feature film as writer-director, Death of a Farmer, which having had a screening at the Dinard Film Festival, had its UK premiere at The Borderlines Film Festival on 5 March 2014.

On 19 February 2014, Eve was part of the invited audience at Buckingham Palace to celebrate the centennial of the Royal Academy of Dramatic Art. He and his wife were asked to perform in front of the Queen in the Investiture Room, along with Hugh Laurie, Sir Tom Courtenay and Dame Helen Mirren. Eve played Professor Higgins in an extract from Pygmalion.

In 2018, Eve played the part of Gerbert d'Aurillac in the TV-series A Discovery of Witches.

Awards
In 1982 Eve was awarded the Laurence Olivier Award for Best Actor in a New Play (1981 theatre season), for his performance in Children of a Lesser God.

In 1997 he was awarded his second Olivier Award for Best Actor in a Supporting Role for his 1996 performance in Uncle Vanya at the Noël Coward Theatre.

Personal life

Eve met Sharon Maughan in 1979, when they both had parts in the West End production of Filumena. They married in 1980 and have three children: Alice Sophia (born 1982), who appeared in Star Trek Into Darkness; Jack (born 1985), film-maker; and George (born 1994), who is front man for the band Two Bottle Jump. While they were raising their children the couple divided their time between Britain and the United States. Trevor Eve, Sharon Maughan and Alice Eve all appeared in She's Out of My League playing father, mother and daughter respectively.

Trevor Eve's interests include golf, painting, architecture and tennis. In 1995 he was seriously injured when he fell badly from his pony while playing polo. He is also a supporter of Chelsea F.C. and a patron of the charity Child Hope UK.

References

External links

Trevor Eve at the BBC Drama Faces

1951 births
Living people
Alumni of Kingston University
Alumni of RADA
English male film actors
English male television actors
English male stage actors
English people of Welsh descent
People educated at Bromsgrove School
Male actors from Birmingham, West Midlands
Laurence Olivier Award winners